Zhang Yuqi (born 8 August 1987), also known as Kitty Zhang, is a Chinese actress best known for portraying Mrs. Yuen in the 2008 film CJ7 — which brought her media attention and kick-started her acting career, and Ruo Lan in the 2016 film The Mermaid.

Early life and career
Zhang was born in Dezhou, Shandong province. She left Shandong at the age of 15 to attend acting school in Shanghai.

Zhang appeared in a minor, uncredited role in the 2007 film The Longest Night in Shanghai. Stephen Chow first noticed her in an advertisement for Kentucky Fried Chicken, and recruited her into his agency. Zhang was given arduous training in acting, dancing, and singing. She made her debut in the science fiction film CJ7, playing a young teacher. The role brought her major media attention, and because of Chow's tradition of placing stars alongside new actresses who later gain other major roles, Zhang has been called one of the "星女郎" (xīng nǚ láng, "star girls" or "Sing girls"—Sing Yeh is a common nickname of Chow's).

After CJ7, Zhang appeared in the Japanese film Shaolin Girl (which was also produced by Chow). Chow considered casting her in Dragonball Evolution, but the role was ultimately given to another actress.

Zhang then starred in the romantic comedy All About Women playing a headstrong business woman. In 2009, she played a country girl with a passion for hip-hop music in Jump, a musical comedy directed by Stephen Fung and penned by Stephen Chow.

Zhang ventured next to the horror genre in the Curse of the Deserted, where she played a college student scoping out a haunted house. She then starred in the kungfu comedy The Butcher, the Chef and the Swordsman, playing a dance hostess.

In 2012, Zhang was cast in the role of Qian Xuesen's wife, Jiang Ying in the biopic of the author. She then starred in the film adaptation of the Chinese literary classic White Deer Plain written by Chen Zhongshi. She plays Tian Xiao'e, a sensual, illiterate woman who follows her instincts. The role posed a challenge to Zhang, as it involved intimate scenes.  Many other actresses rejected the role. Zhang won her first "Best Actress" trophy at the Chinese American Film Festival. She was also voted the Most Popular Actress at the Beijing College Student Film Festival for her performance.

In 2014, Zhang played a supporting role in Peter Chan's film  Dearest, receiving acclaim for performance as a mother who lost a child.

In 2015, Zhang was cast alongside Brandon Routh in Lost in the Pacific, a sci-fi action adventure film directed by Vincent Zhou.

Zhang reunited with mentor Stephen Chow in his 2016 film The Mermaid, where she played the film's antagonist. Variety praised Zhang for "letting herself go.. with her bitchiness and predatory sex appeal". The Mermaid was the highest-grossing film of all-time, and revived Zhang's waning film career.

In 2017, Zhang starred in the fantasy comedy film The Golden Monk directed by Wong Jing. The same year, she starred in Chen Kaige's fantasy mystery film Legend of the Demon Cat. Zhang won the Best Supporting Actress award at the Asian Film Awards for her performance.

Personal life
Zhang Yuqi and Wang Quan'an had a whirlwind romance in 2011, and they married on 18 April in that year. But Zhang has announced they were divorced on 2 July 2015.

Zhang married businessman Yuan Bayuan in October 2016.

On 27 September 2018, Zhang and Yuan Bayuan issued a statement that they had agreed to divorce.

Filmography

Film

Television series

Variety show

Awards

References

External links

1987 births
Living people
Actresses from Shandong
21st-century Chinese actresses
People from Dezhou
Chinese film actresses
Chinese television actresses
Best Supporting Actress Asian Film Award winners
Affiliated Chinese Opera School of Shanghai Theatre Academy alumni